Rahmah ibn Jabir ibn Adhbi al-Jalhami (c. 1760–1826) was an Arab ruler in the Persian Gulf region and was described by his contemporary, the English traveler and author, James Silk Buckingham, as 'the most successful and the most generally tolerated pirate, perhaps, that ever infested any sea.'

As a pirate, he had a reputation for being ruthless and fearless. He wore an eyepatch after losing an eye in battle, which makes him the earliest documented pirate to have worn an eyepatch. He was described by the British statesman Charles Belgrave as 'one of the most vivid characters the Persian Gulf has produced, a daring freebooter without fear or mercy' (ironically, his first name means 'mercy' in Arabic).

He began life as a horse dealer, and he used the money he saved to buy his first ship and with ten companions began a career of buccaneering. He was so successful that he soon acquired a new craft: a 300-ton boat, manned by 350 men. He would later have as many as 2000 followers, many of them black slaves. At one point his flagship was the 'Al-Manowar' (derived from English).

Name

His name, Rahmah ibn Jabir ibn Adhbi Al Jalhami, means Rahmah son of Jabir son of Adhbi of the Jalahimah. His name should be written 'Al Jalhami' if transliterated from Arabic, as 'Al Jalahimah' is the plural name for his tribe.

Description
Rahmah was described by James Silk Buckingham:

Early life
He was born in Grane (present-day Kuwait) around 1760. Rahmah's father, Jabir bin Adhbi, led their tribe from Kuwait to Zubarah in Qatar around 1766. After his tribe migrated alongside the Al Khalifa, the two had a subsequent falling out after the Al Khalifa refused to share the economic gain made from trade ventures. Rahmah's tribe nonetheless agreed to fight alongside the Al Khalifa in their battle against the Persians in Bahrain in 1783. After Bahrain was annexed by the Al Khalifa, Rahmah's tribe, feeling dissatisfied with their share of the rewards, moved first to Bushehr and eventually to Khor Hassan in northwest Qatar. Over a short course of time, Rahmah overtook his eldest brother Abdullah in a struggle for leadership of the tribe; consequently, the tribe adopted piracy as a livelihood.

His base in Khor Hassan, which would serve as his base of operation against the Al Khalifa, was surrounded by a protected bay which contributed to the area's defensive capabilities. He resided in a fort with mud walls and there were only a few huts in the vicinity. As a result of no centralized authority existing in Qatar from the 18th to 19th centuries, Rahmah was able to establish dominion over much of the peninsula for a period after the Al Khalifa relocated to Bahrain.

Alliance with Saudis
Rahmah's alliances with regional powers tended to be on the basis of shared opposition to the Al Khalifa: he formed an alliance with the first Saudi dynasty when it conquered Bahrain, and he founded and relocated to the fort of Dammam in 1809. Though some of his exploits were deemed piratical by the British, J. G. Lorimer, a British historian, remarks on Rahmah's scrupulously correct conduct and his compliance with the laws of warfare. He generally avoided encounters with British cruisers so that he would not incur their anger. In 1809, after the British expedition of the Pirate Coast, many Qasimi refugees fled to Khor Hassan. Rahmah, the leader of Khor Hassan, reached a compromise with the British in which he agreed not to harbour any fugitivites in return for the sparing of the town. The British also sent a warning to the Saudi amir to demand the prevention of Rahmah from launching any attacks on the British.

He influenced the Saudis to launch an invasion of Bahrain in 1809. That greatly strengthened his position in Qatar, rendering him the most powerful tribal leader in the peninsula. Within a short duration, Rahmah had captured eighteen Utub vessels. However, in 1811, the combined forces of Said bin Sultan, Sultan of Muscat and Oman and the Al Khalifa successfully drove out the Wahhabi from Qatar and Bahrain. Rahmah then transferred his headquarters from Khor Hassan to his fort in Dammam.

Alliance with Omanis
In 1816, he allied himself with the rulers of Muscat in their failed invasion of Bahrain, and broke his alliance with the Saudis. The Saudis then destroyed the fort of Dammam in July 1816, and he took refuge in Bushehr, bringing around 500 families with him. Said bin Sultan proposed that he become a subject of Muscat and settle in Oman, but Rahmah refused. He moved back to Dammam in 1818.

Subsequent campaigns
He assisted the British forces in the Persian Gulf campaign of 1819 against the Al-Qasimi of Ras Al Khaimah. The operation was carried out after repeated incidents of piracy perpetrated against British-flagged vessels by the Al-Qasimi.

In January 1820, he and his crew were in preparation to launch a naval invasion on Bahrain from Qatif's port but aborted their plans after being warned by the British. The next month, he travelled to Shiraz with three vessels to proffer his assistance to the prince of Shiraz in his planned expedition of Bahrain. His hostilities against Bahrain continued throughout 1821 and 1822; he and his crew went on to capture 7 Bahraini vessels and kill 20 men. He settled in Bushehr from November 1822 until February 1824, whereupon he returned to his residence in Dammam. He went to Muscat at the beginning of 1825 and lent his assistance to Sheikh Tahnoon Bin Shakhbout in his expedition against the Qasimi tribe of Ras Al Khaimah. Near the end of that year, he commenced a series of predatory attacks on Qatif as punishment for the non-payment of the protection tax owed to him. The British decided not to interfere with his actions if his attacks remained confined to the people of Qatif.

He soon reshifted his focus to the Al Khalifa and went to war with them at the beginning of 1826. After a great number of casualties on his side, he fled to Bushehr where he sought material and military assistance from the British political resident. Having failed to convince the British for aid, he set off to Dammam with a reinforcement of 35 Balochis from Bushehr and continued waging his war against the Al Khalifa.

Death
Rahmah raided a ship belonging to the Al Khalifa rulers of Bahrain in October 1826. After his nephew, Shaikh Ahmed bin Salman Al Khalifa discovered the stolen goods, he decided to intercept Rahmah at sea and return the stolen items at once. In order to reach his uncle, he added the oars of the boat of the Chief of Al Binali tribe, Isa bin Turayf Al Binali, to his own boat to reach his opponent on time.
Hours later and practically blind with cataracts, Rahmah inquired about an approaching boat. After being told its captain was Shaikh Ahmed bin Salman his nephew, he mocked his nephew's bravery saying “The son of Maryoom (Shaikh Ahmed’s mother Maryam was Rahmah’s sister) sails?” After being asked why Rahmah was surprised to see his nephew he said “How can he set sail if he has not approached fair maidens?” It was maritime custom to lead a ship after marriage as young men were not generally captains.

Shaikh Ahmed approached his uncle and attacked. After Rahmah sensed his end might near and heard his slave called ‘Tarar’ was killed, he took his eight-year-old son Shaheen and went to the inner galley of his ship. He lit the gunpowder kegs with charcoal from his hookah, killing all of his men and the Al-Khalifa men that were raiding his ship.

Legacy
Rahmah's legacy lasted long after his death; in the 1960s Charles Belgrave wrote of how old men in the coffee shops throughout the region would still talk of his exploits.

See also
Piracy in the Persian Gulf
Al-Jalahma

References

External links
 Saudi Aramco World article: Rahmah of the Gulf

1760s births
1826 deaths
18th-century Arabs
18th-century Kuwaiti people
18th-century pirates
19th-century Arabs
19th-century Kuwaiti people
19th-century pirates
Bedouin tribal chiefs
Filicides
Kuwaiti people with disabilities
Kuwaiti pirates
Military personnel killed in action
Military personnel who committed suicide
Suicides by explosive device
Qatari pirates
Year of birth uncertain